Powerballin' is the second studio album by the rapper Chingy, released on November 16, 2004, through Capitol Records and Chingy's Slot-A-Lot label. The album entered the Billboard 200 at number 172 with first week sales of 7,000 copies in the US, but then climbed to number 10 with another 120,000 copies sold in the following week. It has since been certified Platinum by the RIAA for shipping over a million copies in the US. The song "I Do" was used in the video game Need for Speed: Underground 2.

Critical reception

Powerballin received mixed reviews from music critics who noted at Chingy's attempt to replicate the success he had with Jackpot. At Metacritic, which assigns a normalized rating out of 100 to reviews from mainstream critics, the album received an average score of 59, based on 9 reviews.

Toshitaka Kondo of Vibe said that despite the middling lyrical content, he commended the instrumental flourishes and contributions of the featured artists found throughout the record, concluding with, "When it's all on the table, Powerballin is more solid than spectacular, but either way, Chingy proves he's a safe bet." Steve Jones of USA Today found the guest artists on the album helpful in recreating Chingy's Jackpot formula, highlighting R. Kelly and Janet Jackson's contributions as stand outs, concluding that "he's found just the ticket for staying in the rotation at radio." Soren Baker, writing for the Los Angeles Times, praised the production for being energetic and Chingy's lyrical content showing creativity and technical ability, saying that he "improves on and refines his successful sonic and thematic formula in an album more consistent and satisfying than its predecessor."

Billboard contributor Rashaun Hall said that despite more R&B-flavored tracks like "Leave wit Me" and "Don't Worry" showing more diversity in the track listing, he found too much familiarity with the album's content of excessive parties, women and luxury talk. AllMusic writer Andy Kellman noted how the record sounds like a rushed version of Jackpot, criticizing the lyrical content and its hooks for being mediocre, and the lacklustre delivery of the guest artists, concluding that "In Chingy's case, a subpar 2004 follow-up would surely fare better commercially than a polished 2006 follow-up." Writing for Rolling Stone, Jon Caramanica also found the album doing little to be different from its predecessor, despite Chingy's charisma delivering on half of the track listing, concluding that "Powerballin serves as a wink behind which there's nothing hidden. It's just a wink, ma."

Track listing

Charts

Weekly charts

Year-end charts

Certifications

References

External links
 

2004 albums
Chingy albums
Capitol Records albums
Albums produced by David Banner
Albums produced by Raphael Saadiq